Tandem Verlag GmbH is a German publishing company and also wholesaler and distributor of print and electronic media products. In addition to producing printed books with a focus on wholesale and discount markets, Tandem Verlag publishes and distributes products in CD-ROM and DVD formats, software and video games packages, music CDs and audiobooks.

The publishing company was founded as a limited liability company in 1994 by business-partners Herbert Ullmann and Hermann Rauers. The headquarters were originally established in Mönchengladbach, later relocating in 1998 to premises in the town of Königswinter in the Cologne region of North Rhine-Westphalia.

Notes

References

External links
 Tandem Verlag company website 
 h.f.ullmann, website of publishing imprint owned by Tandem Verlag (formerly Könemann)

Publishing companies of Germany
CD-ROM publishing companies
Companies based in Cologne
Publishing companies established in 1994
1994 establishments in Germany